Westfield Booragoon (formerly known as Garden City) is a major regional shopping centre in the city of Perth, Western Australia. Westfield Booragoon is located at the corner of Marmion Street and Riseley Street in the southern suburb of Booragoon. 50% of the shopping complex is owned by Dexus with the remaining 50% owned by Scentre Group which owns and operates its properties under the Westfield name from which the company is derived.

The centre has attracted up to 13 million average annual individual visits to the centre generating an estimated turnover of over A$500 million annually. In 2011, it grossed a Moving Annual Turnover (MAT) of A$577.1 million, giving it the highest turnover of any centre in the state and the 13th highest in the country. Westfield Carousel has the 2nd highest MAT in the state. Garden City has been managed under AMP Shopping Centres since 1986; Scentre Group has managed it since December 2019. In 2021, AMP Limited sold their 50% part of the centre to Dexus.

History and development
In the late 1960s, the planning department of the state government drew up a plan for several 'sub-regional' retail centres, which would form the commercial and economic focus of each 'node', and take the retail burden away from the CBD. Booragoon, in the southern suburbs, was chosen as one of the ideal locations.

It was decided to be named 'Garden City'  and construction work was undertaken by Hooker Corporation which began in 1970. In December 1971, Lady Lloyd Jones placed a time-capsule in the ground. The centre was opened in 1972, and immediately became popular as the nexus of the Melville Civic Centre Complex, which had been established after the Melville Council Offices were built in 1968. The site was in the midst of sandy bush, not far from Applecross Senior High School and Wireless Hill Park.

Redevelopments

The original precinct
To visitors today, the original section of Garden City consists of everything from the Davy Street entrance (where HBF is currently situated, as of December 2019), to where one reaches the Garden City Newsagents. Garden City remained this way (with less than 100 shops) until 1983.

New department stores
In the early 1980s, moves were afoot to upgrade Garden City to meet growing demand. The shopping centre's owners went after big-name department stores. One department store, retailer David Jones, had withdrawn from Western Australia, and so Boans (Western Australian predecessor to Myer) and Aherns (since taken over by David Jones) were selected to build two department stores. In 1983, the first major redevelopment went ahead at a cost of A$25 million.

Food court and cinemas
In the next decade or so, demand increased, resulting in the first major expansion in over a decade. In 1994, the current food court was built. This was followed in 1995 with the cinema complex.

1999-2000 Redevelopment
The second major redevelopment of Garden City commenced in January 1999 and was completed in October 2000. The main addition was a new eastern section with three parallel malls. Another big change was the creation of a new 'marketplace' featuring a brand new Coles store in the area previously occupied by K-Mart, and the re-location of K-Mart to the north-eastern corner of the shopping complex. A new bus station was constructed to replace the old one. Another new addition to the shopping centre was the $2.71 million Newmart discount supermarket which opened its doors on 3 October 2000, replacing a Coles outlet which had just relocated to the new 'marketplace' section of the redevelopment, creating 120 jobs for local people. Newmart would later go on to become an Action supermarket in time for Christmas 2003 and then a Woolworths supermarket in late 2005. This phase of expansion removed much of the ground level parking, replacing it with undercover and rooftop parking. Apart from minor modifications to several satellite buildings such as the demolition of a service station in 2005, the shopping centre has remained largely unchanged since.

2021 Redevelopment
After AMP shelved redevelopment plans in December 2020, it was announced that the Booragoon Civic Square Library, which sits next to Westfield Booragoon, would be demolished for redevelopment space of the centre. Almost a year later, on 9 November 2021, funding for a $500 million dollar redevelopment to the centre were found. The redevelopment was split into two stages and consisted of:

First stage
New Fresh Food precinct, which included a relocated Woolworths supermarket, and a new Aldi.
Outdoor entertainment and dining precinct featuring over 15 restaurants and stores across two floors, including a 9 screen Hoyts cinema complex.
53 additional stores, including a relocated food court.
Refurbished Myer and existing centre.
Second stage
A new fashion mall featuring 45 new stores, including a relocated and expanded David Jones.

Plans were approved in late 2021, but received an extension to the end of 2023 to update the plans further. Along with this, AMP Capital sold its 50% share of the centre to Dexus.

Zara at  Westfield Booragoon closed permanently late September 2021 to open at Karrinyup shopping centre as part of a major redevelopment of that centre.

On February 3, 2023, it was reported that plans were once again changed, this time on a larger scale. Plans were approved the following week.

Scrapped 2012-2019 Redevelopment

Following the finalisation of a transaction which gave AMP Capital 100% ownership of the centre, AMP announced on 25 October 2012 that it was planning to invest up to $400 million to upgrade Garden City. The redevelopment would result in a new David Jones, an additional supermarket, an additional discount department store, a new fresh food precinct and an outdoor dining area. Retail in the centre will remain largely single-level. Works on the redevelopment were expected to commence in early 2017 and take over 18 months to complete. However, plans were cancelled before anything took off.
AMP Capital gained approval for the new $750 million redevelopment for Garden City. However, after several delays and an eventual halt on planning and construction work, the plans were considered 'dead'. Later in the same month, Scentre Group purchased 50% of the Garden City property for $575 million, which resulted in the centre being rebranded to Westfield Booragoon. With the purchase, Scentre Group decided to defer redevelopment plans for its other Westfield shopping centre, Westfield Innaloo, to continue plans to redevelop Westfield Booragoon.

Architectural features

As part of the major redevelopment in 1999 and 2000, a significant number of new striking architectural and aesthetic features were added, including a three-storey atrium at the eastern end of the complex in the fashion mall. Recent developments have made the shopping centre a greener place with more plants and more sustainable technology.

Transport
A key Transperth bus station for the southern suburbs, the Booragoon Bus Station, is located at the corner of Riseley and Marmion Streets, and is the fourth bus station to have existed on the shopping centre premises. A number of mainline and feeder bus services operate from or via the station.

Routes 114, 115 and 160 travel via Booragoon Bus Station en route to Perth City (Elizabeth Quay bus station), originating from Munster, Hamilton Hill Hall and Fremantle respectively. The 510 provides a direct connection to Murdoch Station via Fiona Stanley Hospital to Murdoch. The 501 services Booragoon Bus Station while en route to Fremantle and Bull Creek station.

Westfield Booragoon has both undercover and rooftop open-air parking.

Facilities
The main shopping complex consists of a long main mall with several wings and side malls. Coles and Woolworths are the two principal supermarkets, while the anchor department stores include Myer, David Jones and discount department store K-Mart.

In addition to shopping the main shopping complex, Westfield Booragoon houses:
an 8-screen Hoyts cinema
a public library
several external banking buildings
an apartment complex (under construction as at 2021)
another office complex known as Garden City House
the Melville City Council offices
a major regional bus station

Major precincts
The main shopping complex can be broken into several main areas:
the original precinct, centred at the sky-roof atrium which includes Woolworths (a former Action/Newmart store and the original site of Coles in the centre prior to its relocation to the 'marketplace' precinct in 2000, and its conversion to its $2.71 million replacement of its discount supermarket chain Newmart, and is also one of a handful of Woolies stores in Australia which still have the old 1980s-2000s logo)
a food court, which leads to the cinema
a 'marketplace' which includes Coles
a central 'fashion mall' which includes many boutique outlets
two diametrically opposite north–south wings leading to David Jones and Myer
a northern and southern mall parallel to the central mall
a north–south mall at the eastern end of the centre leading to K-Mart

References

Further reading
Builder, The, Jan-Feb 2001 p-43-50. 'Upgrade introduces new shopping concepts',
Melville City Community Paper, Apr 1997, p. 18
Garden City Shopping Centre, Saunders, H. 1987, Western Australian Institute of Technology, Perth

External links

City of Melville website

Westfield Group
Shopping centres in Perth, Western Australia
Shopping malls established in 1972